Tim Jorden (born October 30, 1966) is a former professional American football tight end who played for six seasons in the National Football League (NFL). Jorden played college football at Indiana University where he graduated with a degree in finance.

He played for two seasons with the Pittsburgh Steelers, one with the San Francisco 49ers, and another three with the Arizona Cardinals.

Currently, Jorden resides in Scottsdale, Arizona where he is employed by Homeowners Financial Group.

1966 births
American football tight ends
Pittsburgh Steelers players
Phoenix Cardinals players
Indiana Hoosiers football players
Living people